The Laval-sur-le-Lac–Île-Bizard Ferry is a seasonal reaction ferry, crossing the city limits of Montreal in the Canadian province of Quebec. It carries cars, bicycles and pedestrians across the Rivière des Prairies from Laval-sur-le-Lac to Île Bizard.

As of 2018 season, the cost for automobiles is CAD $4.25 .

See also 
 List of crossings of the Rivière des Prairies

References

External links 
 TRAVERSE LAVAL

Ferries of Quebec
Transport in Laval, Quebec
Transport in Montreal
L'Île-Bizard–Sainte-Geneviève
Cable ferries in Canada